United Nations Security Council resolution 562, adopted on 10 May 1985, after recalling Resolution 530 (1983) and various General Assembly resolutions which affirm the right of Nicaragua and other countries to live in peace without outside interference.

The council also reaffirmed its support for the efforts of the Contadora Group, and called upon all Member States to refrain from carrying out or supporting political, military or economic actions in the region that would impede the peace initiatives of the Contadora Group. It also called upon the governments of the United States and Nicaragua to resume dialogue they had been holding in Mexico with a view to normalising their relations.

The resolution was adopted paragraph by paragraph, and thus no vote on the resolution as a whole took place.

See also
 Contras
 List of United Nations Security Council Resolutions 501 to 600 (1982–1987)
 Nicaragua v. United States
 Psychological Operations in Guerrilla Warfare

References
Text of the Resolution at undocs.org

External links
 

 0562
History of Central America
Politics of Central America
Honduras–Nicaragua border
Nicaragua–United States relations
United States–Central American relations
 0562
 0562
 0562
May 1985 events